BWADC Sporting Club (Beheira Water and Drainage Company Sporting Club), also known as Meiah El Beheira, is an Egyptian football club based in Abu Hummus, Beheira, Egypt. The club is currently playing in the Egyptian Second Division, the second-highest league in the Egyptian football league system.

Egyptian Second Division
Football clubs in Egypt